John Panzio, né Tuckson, Tockson or Toxon (1838-1888), was the African favorite and valet of king Charles XV of Sweden.

Life
He was reportedly born in Africa with a surname variously spelled as Tuckson, Tockson or Toxon, but when he became a favorite of the king, the monarch thought the name Panzio more exotic and fitting for him. It is unknown how he arrived in Sweden. In 1857, he was in Fristad, and was apparently in service of the regimental officer in the Älvsborg regiment before he was introduced by the officer to Prince August, Duke of Dalarna, who took him in service in 1858 and in turn introduced him to Charles XV in 1860.

Officially, he was given the title secondary valet and official pipe cleaner to the king, in reality he was a favorite just as the Armenian Ohan Demirgian, and their presence at court was seen as scandalous. In 1866, he was formally fired, officially for having stolen cigars from the king, unofficially there had reportedly been complaints from the ladies-in-waiting of sexual harassment, but he remained nonetheless, always visible positioned behind the king at dinners.

After the death of the king in 1872, he worked at a bath house. He also started working as a magician and had a couple of different jobs after the career as a royal servant. He died on July 27, 1887, suffering from a stroke.

Legacy
He became the subject of a novel by Sven-Olof Roth: Karl XV:s piprensare. (The Pipe Cleaner of Charles XV).

See also
Gustav Badin

References

 Lars Elgklou (1978). Bernadotte. Historien - eller historier - om en familj.. Stockholm: Askild & Kärnekull Förlag AB. Sid. 88–90. 

1838 births
1888 deaths
Royal favourites
Swedish courtiers
Swedish royal favourites
Swedish people of African descent